General Zamrose bin Mohd Zain (born 22 September 1962 in Seremban, Negeri Sembilan) is a Malaysian General who served as 28th Chief of Malaysian Army.

Honours

 Officer of the Order of Loyalty to the Royal Family of Malaysia (KSD) (1994)
 Officer of the Order of the Defender of the Realm (KMN) (2003)
 Companion of the Order of Loyalty to the Crown of Malaysia (JSM) (2011)
 Companion of the Order of the Defender of the Realm (JMN) (2015)
 Commander of the Order of Loyalty to the Royal Family of Malaysia (PSD) - Datuk (2019)
 Commander of the Order of Loyalty to the Crown of Malaysia (PSM) - Tan Sri (2020)
 Malaysian Armed Forces
 Officer of The Most Gallant Order of Military Service (KAT)
 Warrior of The Most Gallant Order of Military Service (PAT)
 Loyal Commander of The Most Gallant Order of Military Service (PSAT)
 Courageous Commander of The Most Gallant Order of Military Service (PGAT) (2021)
 :
 State of Kedah Distinguished Service Star (BCK)

 Knight Companion of the Order of the Crown of Pahang (DIMP) - Dato' (2009)
 :
 Knight Commander of the Exalted Order of Malacca (DCSM) - Datuk Wira (2015)
 Grand Commander of the Exalted Order of Malacca (DGSM) – Datuk Seri (2021)
 :
 Knight Commander of the Order of Loyalty to Negeri Sembilan (DPNS) – Dato' (2020)
 Knight Grand Companion of the Order of Loyalty to Negeri Sembilan (SSNS) – Dato' Seri (2022)
 :
 Member of the Order of the Crown of Selangor (AMS)
 Knight Grand Commander of the Order of the Crown of Selangor (SPMS) - Dato’ Seri (2020)

 Knight Commander of the Order of the Defender of State (DPPN) - Dato' Seri (2020)

 Grand Commander of the Order of Kinabalu (SPDK) - Datuk Seri Panglima (2021)

  Knight Commander of the Most Exalted Order of the Star of Sarawak (PNBS) – Dato Sri (2022)

References 

1962 births
Living people
Malaysian military personnel
Officers of the Order of Loyalty to the Royal Family of Malaysia
Officers of the Order of the Defender of the Realm
Companions of the Order of Loyalty to the Crown of Malaysia
Commanders of the Order of Loyalty to the Royal Family of Malaysia
Knights Grand Commander of the Order of the Crown of Selangor
Grand Commanders of the Order of Kinabalu
Knights Commander of the Most Exalted Order of the Star of Sarawak